Brady Creek (San Saba River) is a river in Texas.

See also
List of rivers of Texas

References

USGS Hydrologic Unit Map - State of Texas (1974)

Rivers of Texas
Rivers of McCulloch County, Texas
River of Concho County, Texas
Rivers of San Saba County, Texas